The KLF released three long form videos during their career - Waiting, The Rites of Mu, and The Stadium House Trilogy. They also worked on an ambitious road movie - The White Room - which was never released (although bootleg copies are in circulation).

The soundtrack of The White Room was remodelled and reworked in 1991 to create the album The White Room, and the soundtracks to Waiting and The Rites of Mu were released on a 1997 CD (presumed to be a bootleg) called Waiting for the Rights of Mu.

Some footage from The White Room was used in the 1989 music video for Kylie Said To Jason and the 1991 music videos for 3 a.m. Eternal and Justified & Ancient. The films The White Room and Waiting were produced by Bill Butt.

Videography
The White Room (1989)
Waiting (1990)
The Stadium House Trilogy (1991)
The Rites Of Mu (1991)

See also
Watch the K Foundation Burn a Million Quid

References

External links

Films